The Princess Pat is an operetta in three acts with music by Victor Herbert and book and lyrics by Henry Blossom.  After an Atlantic City, New Jersey tryout in August 1915, it premiered on Broadway on September 29, 1915 at the Cort Theatre and ran for 158 performances.  Herbert wrote the piece for the soprano Eleanor Painter (1891-1947).

Characters and original cast

Frances Hedges - Una Brooks  
General John Holbrook - Louis Casavant  
Maude Van Cortlandt - Lilian Charles     
Si Perkins - Alexander Clark  
Jack Wickham - William Collins  
Dorothy Pryme - Lyn Donaldson  
Lee Bainbridge - Carl Drury  
Duncan Arthur - Sven Erick  
Elsie Smith - Kathleen Erroll  
Grace Holbrook - Eva Fallon  
Nat Franklin - Irving Fast  
Anne Winthrop - Clare Freeman  
Sidney Gray - Jack Hagner     
Bob Darrow - Sam B. Hardy  
Thomas - Martin Haydon   
Coralie Bliss - Doris Kenyon  
Bella Wells - Charlotte La Grande  
Prince Antonio di Montaldo - Joseph Lertora  
Reggie Calthorpe - Este Morrison  
Marie - Leonora Novasio      
Tony Schmalz, Jr. - Robert Ober
Princess de Montaldo - Eleanor Painter  
Teddy Thorne - William Quinby  
Bertie Ashland - Ralph Riggs  
Achille Mazetti - Mario Rogati 
Al Shean - Anthony Schmalz 
Hester Lisle - Clara Taylor     
Gabrielle Fourneaux - Katherine Witchie

Synopsis
Princess Patrice O'Connor, from Ireland, is married to Prince Antonio di Montaldo.  The Prince is unattentive, now that the couple has married, and so Pat pretends to elope with the aging Anthony Schmalz to make him jealous and to help her friend Grace.  Her scheme works well: the Prince's passion is revived, and Grace marries a younger and more suitable member of the Schmalz family.

Song list
Allies - Marie and Thomas        
Make Him Guess - Grace Holbrook and Ladies        
I'd Like to Be a Quitter, But I Find It Hard to Quit - Tony Schmalz, Jr.       
Love Is the Best of All - Princess de Montaldo and Ensemble       
For Better or For Worse (Sunshine) - Princess de Montaldo and Grace Holbrook        
When a Girl's About to Marry - Grace Holbrook, General John Holbrook and Anthony Schmalz       
Estellita - Ensemble        
Neapolitan Love Song (T'amo!) - Prince Antonio di Montaldo       
I Wish I Was an Island in an Ocean of Girls - Anthony Schmalz and Girls       
I Need Affection - Princess de Montaldo       
All for You - Princess de Montaldo and Prince Antonio di Montaldo    
In a Little World for Two -  Princess de Montaldo, Bob Darrow, Grace Holbrook and Tony Schmalz, Jr.       
The Shoes of Husband Number One Are Worn by Number Two -  Si Perkins       
Two Laughing Irish Eyes - Ensemble

External links
The Princess Pat at the Internet Broadway Database
List of musical numbers and links to MIDI files and cast list
Information about an Off-off-Broadway production in 1981
Vocal score of The Princess Pat

English-language operettas
Broadway musicals
1915 musicals
1915 operas
Operas by Victor Herbert